(born March 19, 1978) is a Japanese manga artist born in Kanagawa Prefecture, Japan who is best known for her series W Juliet. She made her professional debut in 1994 in Hana to Yume.

Works
Nana-iro no Shinwa
W Juliet
Michibata no Tenshi
Gokuraku Dōmei
W Juliet II
Grand Sun
Kyō mo Ashita mo

External links
Comicate interview 
Hakusensha interview 

Manga artists from Kanagawa Prefecture
1978 births
Living people